Aloke Mazumdar (born 1 October 1947) is an Indian former cricketer. He played three first-class matches for Bengal between 1965 and 1968.

See also
 List of Bengal cricketers

References

External links
 

1947 births
Living people
Indian cricketers
Bengal cricketers
Cricketers from Kolkata